Odontomantis planiceps, also known as Asian ant mantis, is a common species of praying mantis.

Description 
Odontomantis planiceps is a small mantis, with adult size ranging from 1.4 cm for males and 2.0 cm for females. It is commonly called the Asian ant mantis because it exhibits batesian mimicry in its juvenile stages, resembling black ants - most notably from the 1st to 3rd instar at which they are most vulnerable from predators.

Odontomantis planiceps is completely black from the 1st to 3rd instar, with green bands at the edges of every thorax segment.

After molting to the 4th instar and up to its ultimate molt, they are mostly green with some variation in color depending on the vegetation in which they reside.

Distribution 
Odontomantis planiceps is a very common mantis throughout its range, readily acclimating and even thriving in urban gardens and inhabiting ornamental plants.

The geographic distribution of this mantis is wide, with most specimens collected in the Southeast Asian range from Malaysia to Indonesia, and this species has even been reported in Hong Kong and Taiwan.

Behaviour 
Odontomantis planiceps usually stands still on leaves waiting for prey to pass. If there is an assumed threat, it will quickly retreat to the bottom of its leaf, while adult males will not hesitate to fly.

See also
List of mantis genera and species

References

Hymenopodidae
Insects of Asia
Insects described in 1913